Pedius may refer to:

 Pedius (beetle), a genus of beetles in the family Carabidae
 Quintus Pedius (consul) (d. 43 BC), Roman general, politician, great nephew of dictator Julius Caesar, maternal cousin to Roman emperor Augustus
 Quintus Pedius Poplicola (fl. 1st century BC), son to Quintus Pedius, senator and orator
 Quintus Pedius (painter), son to Quintus Pedius Publicola, and first deaf person recorded by name
 Sextus Pedius (50-120), Roman jurist

See also

 
 Pedia gens